The Nærøyfjord (or Nærøyfjorden) is a fjord in Aurland Municipality in Vestland county, Norway. The narrow fjord is a branch of the large Sognefjord, and it is featured on the "Norway in a Nutshell" daytrips for tourists.

The river Nærøydalselvi flows down the valley Nærøydalen into the fjord at the village of Gudvangen, near the European route E16 highway.  The village of Bakka and the Bakka Church are both located on the west shore of the fjord.

Since 2005, the Nærøyfjord has been listed as a UNESCO World Heritage Site.  It has also been rated by the National Geographic Society as the world's number one natural heritage site along with the Geirangerfjord.

In popular culture
Nærøyfjord was also used as an inspiration for Arendelle in Frozen.

Media gallery

References

External links

Nærøyfjord Website
Official tourist information

Fjords of Vestland
World Heritage Sites in Norway
Aurland
Sognefjord